Varadarajan is both a surname and a given name. Notable people with the name include:

Siddharth Varadarajan (born 1965), founding editor of The Wire
Srinidhi Varadarajan, director of Virginia Tech’s Terascale Computing Facility
W. R. Varadarajan (1945–2010), Indian politician and trade unionist
Tunku Varadarajan, Professor of Business at New York University
Veeravalli S. Varadarajan (1937–2019), mathematician
Varadarajan Mudaliar (1926–1988)